Family with sequence similarity 151 member A (abbreviated FAM151A) is a protein that in humans is encoded by the FAM151A gene.  The protein is a transmembrane protein expressed in the kidney tubules, and is an ortholog of menorin, a protein involved in neuron development in nematodes.

Gene 

The FAM151A gene contains 8 exons and is located on the minus strand of chromosome 1 at 1p32.3, spanning approximately 14 kbp. The last exon contains approximately half of the coding sequence, and overlaps with the 3' UTR of gene ACOT11. No alternative splicings of FAM151A are known.

Expression 

The mRNA transcript of FAM151A is expressed in the kidney, small intestine, and liver, while the FAM151A protein is only expressed in kidney tubules.

Protein 

The FAM151A protein contains three known domains, one transmembrane domain and two domains of unknown function DUF2181. DUF2181 is a member of the GDPD/PLCD superfamily, which are known to hydrolyze glycerophosphodiester bonds. The second DUF2181 of FAM151A is hypothesized to be nonfunctional through homology analysis. The molecular weight of FAM151A is known to be approximately 95 kDa.

Evolutionary history

Orthologs of FAM151A 
FAM151A has direct orthologs in chimpanzee, mouse, zebrafish, and other members of the clade Eumetazoa that diverged from humans up to around 700 million years ago. However, FAM151A does not have any known orthologs in birds.

Protein family FAM151/Menorin 
FAM151A has one known paralog in humans, FAM151B, which contains only the first DUF2181 and no transmembrane region. In mammals, both FAM151A and FAM151B are homologs of the C. elegans menorin gene, involved in dendrite branching.

Clinical significance 
FAM151A contains an SNP, rs11206394, that is a significant predictor of colorectal cancer. The SNP is a missense mutation that occurs in the region of the second DUF2181 of FAM151A that overlaps with the 3' UTR of ACOT11. Individuals with both copies of the minor allele have been observed to have the odds of cancer decreased between 11% and 59%.

References 

Proteins
Genes
Uncharacterized proteins